Passovia is a genus of flowering plants belonging to the family Loranthaceae.

Its native range is south-eastern Mexico to Tropical America. It is found in Belize, Bolivia, Brazil, Colombia, Costa Rica, Ecuador, El Salvador, French Guiana, Guatemala, Guyana, Honduras, Jamaica, Mexico, Nicaragua, Panamá, Peru, Suriname, Trinidad-Tobago, Venezuela, Venezuelan Antilles and the Windward Islands.

The genus name of Passovia is in honour of Friedrich Passow (19th century), the German consul in Puerto Cabello in Venezuela. He was also a member of Rostock's naturalist society. It was first described and published in Bot. Zeitung (Berlin) Vol.4 on page 107 in 1846.

Known species
According to Kew:
Passovia beckii 
Passovia biloba 
Passovia bisexualis 
Passovia brasiliana 
Passovia coarctata 
Passovia cordata 
Passovia diffusa 
Passovia disjectifolia 
Passovia ensifera 
Passovia myrsinites 
Passovia ovata 
Passovia pedunculata 
Passovia podoptera 
Passovia pycnostachya 
Passovia pyrifolia 
Passovia robusta 
Passovia rufa 
Passovia santaremensis 
Passovia subtilis 
Passovia theloneura

References

Loranthaceae
Loranthaceae genera
Plants described in 1846
Flora of Southeastern Mexico
Flora of Central America
Flora of Jamaica
Flora of Trinidad and Tobago
Flora of the Venezuelan Antilles
Flora of the Windward Islands
Flora of northern South America
Flora of western South America
Flora of Brazil